Alexander Cox (6 August 1865 – 21 November 1950) was an English cricketer. He played two first-class matches for Cambridge University Cricket Club in 1887.

See also
 List of Cambridge University Cricket Club players

References

External links
 

1865 births
1950 deaths
English cricketers
Cambridge University cricketers
Cricketers from Liverpool